Sunz of Man is a New York-based Wu-Tang Clan affiliated group that currently consists of Prodigal Sunn, Killah Priest, Hell Razah and 60 Second Assassin. The group's first incarnation also included Shabazz the Disciple, 7th Ambassador and producer Su-Preme.

History

1994–1996 
Prior to being affiliated with Wu-Tang, Sunz were initially known as Da Last Future and included Shabazz the Disciple, 7th Ambassador and producer Su-Preme, but not 60 Second Assassin,. Upon their induction into the Wu-Tang family, the group became the first group signed to Wu-Tang Records. In 1995 and 1996, the group released a number of singles, including "No Love Without Hate", "Soldiers of Darkness" (a collaboration with Killarmy), "Five Arch Angels" and "Bloody Choices". These tracks were to be included on the group's planned debut album Nothing New Under the Sun, originally scheduled for release in 1996. Due to label complications, the album was eventually shelved.

1997–2001 
In 1997, the group signed a deal with Red Ant Entertainment. Their first release on the label was the "We Can't Be Touched" b/w "Natural High" single, released that same year.  They also made an appearance on Mood's debut album Doom on the song "Illuminated Sunlight". "Natural High" was included on the group's 1998 debut album The Last Shall be First. The album featured production from Su-Preme, as well as Wu producers RZA, 4th Disciple and True Master, and Wyclef Jean. Album guests included Wu-Tang members Masta Killa, Method Man, Raekwon, Ol' Dirty Bastard and U-God, as well as Killarmy's Beretta 9, Dreddy Kruger and Tekitha. The album debuted at #20 on the Billboard 200 album chart, and #7 on the R&B/Hip-Hop charts. The album received moderate acclaim from critics.

Before the release of the debut, Killah Priest began to clash with Wu leader RZA, as Shabazz had earlier, both eventually cutting their Wu ties, and leaving the group for solo careers. In 1999, the album The First Testament was released, compiled of the group's earlier work, with contributions from Shabazz and 7th Ambassador. A number of tracks from the album were released on singles, including "Deep in the Water", "In the Beginning..." and "The Sins of Men". However, due to heavy bootlegging, the album never saw a proper release. The group took a hiatus, while Killah Priest established his solo career.

2002–2006 
Hell Razah, Prodigal Sunn and 60 Second Assassin, returned in 2002 with the group's second official studio album Saviorz Day. The album was met with a lukewarm reception commercially  and critically. In 2004, The First Testament saw a re-release as Elements, which featured most of the tracks from The First Testament, as well as a handful of other previously unreleased tracks. Later in 2004, Hell Razah and 4th Disciple (under the prefix "Sunz of Man presents") released the album Freedom of Speech, which spawned the single "Article One" b/w "Project Love". In 2003, Shabazz announced a return to the group, but a new group album has yet to be recorded, and no further efforts were made. The group's most recent release was a 2006 compilation titled The Old Testament, which features the group's early singles as well as some of their later hits.

Solo careers 
Killah Priest was the first SoM member to embark on a solo career, releasing his acclaimed debut album Heavy Mental a few months prior to The Last Shall Be First. He released more studio albums, 2000's View From Masada, 2001's Priesthood, 2003's Black August and 2007's The Offering. Hell Razah released his solo debut When All Hell Breaks Loose in 2001 and received little attention. Shabazz the Disciple released his long-delayed debut album The Book of Shabazz (Hidden Scrollz) in 2003, which included a number of his early singles, such as "Crime Saga", "The Lamb's Blood" and "Street Parables". Prodigal Sunn released his solo debut The Return of the Prodigal Sunn in 2005. Also in 2005, Killah Priest and Hell Razah, along with Royal Fam's Timbo King and New York veteran Tragedy Khadafi formed the Black Market Militia, and released their self-titled album. Hell Razah released two albums in 2007, first Renaissance Child in February, and second Razah's Ladder, a collaboration with producers Blue Sky Black Death, released in October. Razah and Shabazz teamed up with producer Ayatollah in 2008 to form T.H.U.G. Angelz, and release their debut Welcome to Red Hook Houses.

In early 2019, Hell Razah was featured in the song "The Grandmaster" on Cryptik Soul's album Killer's Blood.

2019–present 
In 2019, Sunz Of Man returns and released their third official studio album "The Rebirth", which featured Cappadonna, Planet Asia, La The Darkman, 12 O'Clock, Makeba Mooncycle, Chi King, Shaka Amazulu The 7th and Tristate.

Discography

Videography

References

See also 
List of Wu-Tang Clan affiliates

African-American musical groups
Five percenters
Hip hop groups from New York City
Musical groups established in 1994
Musical groups from Brooklyn
Wu-Tang Clan affiliates